Events from the year 1876 in art.

Events
 April – Impressionist exhibition at the house of Paul Durand-Ruel, 11 rue Peletier, in Paris.
 May 16 – German American "Napoleon of crime" Adam Worth steals Gainsborough's Portrait of Georgiana, Duchess of Devonshire from Agnew's gallery in Old Bond Street, London three weeks after its sale at Christie's for 10,000 guineas, the highest price ever paid for a painting at auction at this time. It is not recovered until 1901.
 Henrietta Montalba exhibits at the Royal Academy for the first time.
 Kathleen Newton moves into the London home of James Tissot, becoming his mistress and model.

Paintings

 Lawrence Alma-Tadema
 An Audience at Agrippa's
 Ninety-Four Degrees in the Shade
 Thomas Armstrong – Woman with Lilies
 Edward Mitchell Bannister – Under the Oaks
 Albert Fitch Bellows – Sunday in Devonshire
 Gustave Caillebotte
 Le déjeuner ("Lunch")
 Le Pont de l'Europe ("The Europe Bridge")
 Portraits in the country
 Young Man at the Piano (Martial Caillebotte)
 Paul Cézanne – Vase of Flowers
 Ernest Christophe – La Comédie humaine - Le Masque (marble; Musée d'Orsay, Paris)
 Georges Clairin – Portrait de Sarah Bernhardt
 Gustave Courbet – Entree d'un Gave
 Edgar Degas
 L'Absinthe (Musée d'Orsay, Paris)
 Duchesa di Montejasi with her Daughters, Elena and Camilla (Museum of Fine Arts, Boston)
 Paul Dubois – My Children
 Thomas Eakins – The Chess Players
 Winslow Homer – Breezing Up ("A Fair Wind")
 James Wilson Alexander MacDonald – Statue of Fitz-Greene Halleck (bronze, New York City)
 John MacWhirter – Spindrift
 Édouard Manet – Before the Mirror (Guggenheim Museum, New York City)
 Anton Mauve – Morning Ride on the Beach
 John Everett Millais – Lord Ronald Gower
 Claude Monet
 Coin du jardin à Montgeron (Hermitage Museum, Saint Petersburg)
 La Japonaise (Camille Monet in Japanese Costume)
 Gustave Moreau – Salome Dancing before Herod
 Pierre-Auguste Renoir
 A Girl with a Watering Can (National Gallery of Art, Washington, D.C.)
 Bal du moulin de la Galette ("Dance at Le Moulin de la Galette") (Musée d'Orsay, Paris)
 The Swing
 In the Garden (Pushkin Museum, Moscow)
 Ilya Repin – Sadko
 Emma Sandys – Fiammetta
 Henryk Siemiradzki – Nero's Torches
 William James Stillman – English Wild Flowers
 James Tissot
 A Passing Storm
 The Thames
 Viktor Vasnetsov – Moving House

Sculptures

 Thomas Ball
 Emancipation Memorial
 Statue of Daniel Webster
 Frédéric Auguste Bartholdi 
 Bartholdi Fountain
 Statue of the Marquis de Lafayette
 Charles E. Cassell - Confederate Monument
 Carl Conrads -  The American Volunteer
 Andrew Currie - Statue of Robert the Bruce, Stirling Castle
 Moses Jacob Ezekiel - Religious Liberty
 Richard Saltonstall Greenough - John Winthrop
 Herman Kirn - Catholic Total Abstinence Union Fountain
 James Wilson Alexander MacDonald - Statue of Fitz-Greene Halleck
 Matthew Noble - Statue of Robert Peel, Parliament Square
 Louis Rebisso - Equestrian statue of James B. McPherson
 Amelia Robertson Hill - Statue of David Livingstone, Edinburgh
 Randolph Rogers - Statue of William H. Seward
 Horatio Stone - Statue of Edward Dickinson Baker
 Anne Whitney - Statue of Samuel Adams
 Unknown - Confederate Monument of Bowling Green
 Unknown - Dauphin County Veteran's Memorial Obelisk

Births
 February 8 – Paula Modersohn-Becker, German painter (died 1907)
 Ásgrímur Jónsson - Ásgrímur Jónsson, Icelandic painter (died 1958)
 March 23 – Muirhead Bone, Scottish-born etcher (died 1953)
 April 1 – Jacoba van Heemskerck, Dutch painter and graphic artist (died 1923)
 April 11 – Paul Henry, Irish painter (died 1958)
 June 22 – Madeleine Vionnet, French fashion designer (died 1975)
 July 12 – Alphaeus Philemon Cole, American portrait artist (died 1988)
 July 17 – Melvin Ormond Hammond, Canadian photographer (died 1934)
 August 9 – Augustin Lesage, French outsider artist (died 1954)
 September 3 – Olive Edis, English photographer (died 1955)
 September 14 – César Klein, German painter and designer (died 1954)
 November 4 - James Earle Fraser, American sculptor (died 1953)
 November 17 – August Sander, German photographer (died 1964)
 December 23 – Stevan Aleksić, Serbian painter (died 1923).
 date unknown – Hiroshi Yoshida, Japanese painter and woodblock print maker (died 1950)

Deaths
 January 22 – Sir George Harvey, Scottish painter (born 1806)
 February 29
 Charles-Philippe Larivière, French academic painter and lithographer (born 1798)
 Jozef Van Lerius, Belgian romantic-historical painter (born 1823)
 March 13 – Joseph von Führich, Austrian painter (born 1800)
 April 8 – John Graham Lough, English sculptor of funerary monuments (born 1798)
 June 11 – Giovanni Battista Cassevari, Italian miniature portrait painter (born 1789)
 August 15 – John Frederick Lewis, English painter (born 1805)
 August 27 – Eugène Fromentin, French painter (born 1820)
 September 17 – Franz Nadorp, German painter primarily working and living in Rome (born 1794)
 October 21 – Uroš Knežević, Serbian painter (born 1811)
 November 10 – Édouard Traviès, French painter (born 1809)
 November 18 – Narcisse Virgilio Diaz, French painter (born 1807)
 date unknown – Robert Richard Scanlan, Irish painter and portraitist (born 1801)

References

 
Years of the 19th century in art
1870s in art